The buffy laughingthrush (Pterorhinus berthemyi), also known as the chestnut-winged laughingthrush is a species of bird in the family Leiothrichidae. It is found in the Chinese mainland.  It was formerly considered a subspecies of the rusty laughingthrush, P. poecilorhynchus; a species restricted to Taiwan following the split. Compared to the rusty laughingthrush, the buffy laughingthrush has paler grey underparts, more contrasting rufous wings, broader white tips to the tail, and distinct black lores.

This species was formerly placed in the genus Garrulax but following the publication of a comprehensive molecular phylogenetic study in 2018, it was moved to the resurrected genus Pterorhinus.

References

buffy laughingthrush
Birds of Central China
Birds of South China
Endemic birds of China
buffy laughingthrush
Taxobox binomials not recognized by IUCN